Ed W. "Too Tall" Freeman (November 20, 1927 – August 20, 2008) was a United States Army helicopter pilot who received the United States military's highest decoration, the Medal of Honor, for his actions in the Battle of Ia Drang during the Vietnam War. During the battle, he flew through gunfire numerous times, bringing supplies to a trapped American battalion and flying dozens of wounded soldiers to safety. Freeman was a wingman for Major Bruce Crandall who also received the Medal of Honor for the same missions.

Early life
Freeman was born in Neely, Greene County, Mississippi, the sixth of nine children. When he was 13 years old, he saw thousands of men on maneuvers pass by his home in Mississippi. He knew then that he would become a soldier.

Freeman grew up in nearby McLain, Mississippi, and graduated from Washington High School. At age 17, before graduating from high school, Freeman served in the United States Navy for two years. After the war, he returned to his hometown and graduated from high school. He joined the United States Army in September 1948, and married Barbara Morgan on April 30, 1955. They had two sons: Mike, born in 1956, and Doug, born in 1962.

Military career

World War II

Korean War
By the time of the Korean War, Freeman reached the army rank of first sergeant. Although he was in the Corps of Engineers, his company fought as infantry soldiers in Korea. He participated in the Battle of Pork Chop Hill and earned a battlefield commission as one of only 14 survivors out of 257 men who made it through the opening stages of the battle. His second lieutenant bars were pinned on by General James Van Fleet personally. He then assumed command of B Company and led them back up Pork Chop Hill.

The commission made him eligible to become a pilot, a childhood dream of his. However, when he applied for pilot training he was told that, at six feet four inches, he was "too tall" for pilot duty. The phrase stuck, and he was known by the nickname of "Too Tall" for the rest of his career. In 1955, the height limit for pilots was raised and Freeman was accepted into flying school. He first flew fixed-wing army airplanes before switching to helicopters. After the Korean War, he flew the world on mapping missions.

Vietnam War
By the time Freeman was sent to Vietnam in 1965, he was an experienced helicopter pilot and was placed second-in-command of his sixteen-aircraft unit. He served as a captain in Company A, 229th Assault Helicopter Battalion, 1st Cavalry Division (Airmobile).

On November 14, 1965, Freeman and his unit transported a battalion of American soldiers to the Ia Drang Valley. Later, after arriving back at base, they learned that the soldiers had come under intense fire and had taken heavy casualties. Enemy fire around the landing zones was so heavy that the landing zone was closed to medical evacuation helicopters. Freeman and his commander, Major Bruce Crandall, volunteered to fly their unarmored, lightly armed UH-1 Huey in support of the embattled troops. Freeman made a total of fourteen trips to the battlefield, bringing in water and ammunition and taking out wounded soldiers under heavy enemy fire in what was later named the Battle of Ia Drang.

Freeman was subsequently promoted to the rank of major, designated as a Master Army Aviator, and was sent home from Vietnam in 1966.

Medal of Honor

Freeman's commanding officer nominated him for the Medal of Honor for his actions at Ia Drang, but not in time to meet a two-year deadline then in place. He was instead awarded the Distinguished Flying Cross. The Medal of Honor nomination was disregarded until 1995, when the two-year deadline was removed. He was formally presented with the medal on July 16, 2001, in the East Room of the White House by President George W. Bush.

Freeman's official Medal of Honor citation reads:

Awards and decorations

Civilian life
Freeman retired from the military in 1967. Freeman and his family settled in the Treasure Valley area of Idaho, his wife Barbara's home state. He continued to work as a pilot. He flew helicopters for another 24 years, fighting wildfires, conducting animal censuses, and herding wild horses for the Department of the Interior until his second retirement in 1991. By then, he had 17,000 flight hours in helicopters, 22,000 overall.

Death and legacy
Freeman died on August 20, 2008, due to complications from Parkinson's disease. He was buried with full military honors at the Idaho State Veterans Cemetery in Boise.

In the 2002 film We Were Soldiers, which depicted the Battle of Ia Drang, Freeman was portrayed by Mark McCracken.

The post office in Freeman's hometown of McLain, Mississippi, was renamed the "Major Ed W. Freeman Post Office" in March 2009.

See also

List of Medal of Honor recipients for the Vietnam War

References

External links

1927 births
2008 deaths
Vietnam War recipients of the Medal of Honor
United States Army Medal of Honor recipients
Battle of Ia Drang
Recipients of the Distinguished Flying Cross (United States)
Recipients of the Gallantry Cross (Vietnam)
Recipients of the Air Medal
United States Army personnel of the Korean War
United States Army personnel of the Vietnam War
United States Army officers
American Korean War pilots
American Vietnam War pilots
American Master Army Aviators
Deaths from Parkinson's disease
People from Greene County, Mississippi
Neurological disease deaths in Idaho